A Retrospective is the first compilation album by the American group Pink Martini, released in September 2011 in the United Kingdom and the following month in the United States, Australia and Canada. The album contains twenty-one tracks from six studio albums. Guest artists include Michael Feinstein ("How Long Will It Last?"), French singer and songwriter Georges Moustaki ("Ma Solitude") and director Gus Van Sant ("Moon River"); the compilation also features remixes by New York City disc jockey Johnny Dynell ("Una Notte a Napoli") and Hiroshi Wada ("Kikuchiyo to Mohshimasu").

Critical reception of the compilation album was positive overall; many reviewers appreciated the album in its entirety but criticized select tracks. A Retrospective reached a peak position of number seven on Billboard Top Jazz Albums chart.

Composition

A Retrospective contains twenty-one tracks totaling more than seventy minutes in length, some of which were previously unreleased. Tracks originally appearing on the group's 1997 debut album Sympathique include Manuel Jiménez's "¿Donde Estas Yolanda?", "La Soledad", "Sympathique", "Que Sera Sera" by Ray Evans and Jay Livingston, and "Amado Mio". "Hang On Little Tomato", "Una Notte a Napoli", "Anna (El Negro Zumbón)", "Lilly" and "Aspettami" first appeared on Hang On Little Tomato (2004). The group's 2007 album Hey Eugene! included the song of the same name; similarly, "Splendor in the Grass" was the title track of the 2009 album of the same name. The samba-influenced version of "Auld Lang Syne" was the final track on Pink Martini's 2010 holiday album Joy to the World. 1969, the collaborative album with Saori Yuki first released in October 2011, included Jorge Ben Jor's "Mas que Nada".

"Moon River", originally by Henry Mancini and Johnny Mercer, and "The Man with the Big Sombrero" were previously unreleased. "Moon River" featured guest vocals by director Gus Van Sant, marking his singing debut. French singer-songwriter Georges Moustaki provided vocals on "Ma Solitude", and pianist and singer Michael Feinstein contributed to Max Lief and Joseph Meyer's "How Long Will It Last?" The compilation also features two remixed recordings: "Una Notte a Napoli" by New York City disc jockey Johnny Dynell, and an instrumental version of "Kikuchiyo to Mohshimasu" by Hiroshi Wada. "Kikuchiyo to Mohshimasu" originally appeared on Hang On Little Tomato.

Included with the album is a 48-page booklet of previously unseen Polaroid pictures taken by Thomas Lauderdale, along with postcards and posters from Pink Martini's history. A deluxe hardbound CD book version was also available for purchase. The group promoted the release of A Retrospective and 1969 by touring throughout the United States, including a holiday special in Portland, Oregon featuring Saori Yuki as part of their Holiday Tour.

Reception

Overall, critical reception of the album was positive, though some reviewers criticized select tracks. Michael Upchurch of The Seattle Times wrote that the "A" before "Retrospective" in the album's title was appropriate and that the compilation included highlights of the group's career.  The New Zealand Herald Lydia Jenkin thought the collection represented a standard Pink Martini concert set list by including a variety of sounds, languages and vocalists, each delivered with "class, passion and subtlety". Jenkin awarded the album 3.5 of 5 stars, complimenting the album overall but noting that some tracks featured less "elegant sophistication" or "imaginative" arrangements. Marion Pragt wrote a positive review for The Cambridge Student, believing the compilation incorporated various styles of music and reflected the group's "cosmopolitan nature". Pragt concluded by asserting that the album was "perfect for avid admirers and newcomers alike".

Rave magazine's Chad Parkhill rated the album three of four stars. Parkhill described "Auld Lang Syne" as "weirdly off-kilter" and found Dynell's remix to be "profoundly derivative", but also called some of the previously unreleased material "wonderful". Tom D'Antoni of Oregon Music News called Van Sant's performance "truly awful in execution", but considered the album to be "simply sensational" overall. The Sydney Star Observer Nick Bond complimented the album's artwork and packaging.

Track listing

Track listing adapted from Allmusic.

Personnel

 Patrick Abbey – composer
 Keiko Araki – violin
 Jennifer Arnold – viola
 Eric Asakawa – choir, chorus
 Kazunori Asano – acoustic guitar, ukulele
 Phil Baker – double bass, sitar
 Joël Belgique – viola
 Jorge Ben Jor – composer
 Lauren Berg – choir, chorus
 Heather Blackburn – cello
 Gianni Boncompagni – composer
 Gavin Bondy – choir, chorus, trumpet, vocals
 Phil Boutelje – composer
 Edith Bradway – violin
 Robert Burns – composer
 Brandyn Callahan – choir, chorus
 Luis Candido – cavaquinho
 João Canziani – cover photo
 Foster Carling – composer
 Pansy Chang – cello
 Joe Chiccarelli – mixing
 Frédéric Chopin – composer
 Alba Clemente – composer, narrator
 Julie Coleman – violin
 Tim Cooper – surdo
 Noah Cotter – choir, chorus
 Nicholas Crosa – soloist, violin
 Drew Danin – tamborim
 Brian Davis – choir, chorus, conga, cuica, direction, drums, maracas, percussion, repenique, shaker, surdo, vocals
 Ami Davolt – violin
 Daniel Dempsey – choir, chorus
 Esteban Diaz – caixa
 Johnny Dynell – composer, remixing
 David Eby – cello
 Stephen Echlemann – choir, chorus
 Adam Esbensen – cello
 Ray Evans – composer
 Gregory Ewer – violin
 Joy Fabos – violin
 Dan Faehnle – electric guitar, guitar
 Michael Feinstein – vocals
 Doris Fisher – composer
 China Forbes – composer, tambourine, vocals
 Dave Friedlander – engineer, mixing
 Jeramie Gajan – choir, chorus
 Forrest Gamba – choir, chorus
 David Gerhards – choir, chorus
 Francesco Giordano – composer
 Randall Givens – caixa
 Jeremy Gordon – surdo
 Paloma Griffin – violin
 Luise Gruber – violin
 Bernie Grundman – mastering
 Kassandra Haddock – choir, chorus
 Tracey Harris – soloist, backing vocals
 Tadashi Hashimoto –assistant engineer
 Elena Hess – choir, chorus
 Mike Horsfall – vibraphone
 Kathleen Hunt – caixa
 Alex Hutchinson – design
 Jun Iwasaki – violin
 John Jenness – caixa
 Tim Jensen – flute
 Manuel Jiménez – composer
 Adam Johnson – choir, chorus
 Taylor Johnson –choir, chorus
 Anthony Jones – drums
 Justin Kagan – cello
 Shauna Keyes – viola
 Matthew Krane –choir, chorus
 Thomas Lauderdale – arranger, choir, chorus, composer, fender rhodes, keyboards, photography, piano, vocals
 Norman Leyden – clarinet
 Max Lief – composer
 Jay Livingston – composer
 Maureen Love – harp
 Henry Mancini – composer
 Alex Marashian – composer
 Johnny Mercer – composer
 Aaron Meyer – violin
 Joseph Meyer – composer
 Georges Moustaki – composer, guitar, vocals
 Jay Mower – tamborim
 Calvin Multanen – choir, chorus
 Luke Multanen – choir, chorus
 Osao Murata – organ
 Ara Nelson – tamborim
 Timothy Nishimoto – backing vocals, choir, chorus, shaker, vocals
 Charles Noble – viola
 Audrey Overby – choir, chorus
 Franco Pisano – composer
 Chelsea Plaskitt – choir, chorus
 Pete Plympton – engineer
 Pepe Raphael – composer, vocals
 Derek Rieth – bongos, choir, chorus, percussion, shaker, surdo, tambourine, timpani
 Allan Roberts – composer
 Richard Rothfus – bongos, drums, percussion, shaker, vocals
 Mia Hall Savage – direction
 Dr. Dirgham Sbait – adaptation, assistant, composer
 Lauren Searls – choir, chorus
 Peter Sellers – sitar
 Pauline Serrano – chocalhos
 Jacques Sevin  – composer
 Doris Smith – backing vocals
 Doug Smith – choir, chorus, claves, cymbals, drums, guiro, percussion, shaker, timbales, vibraphone, vocals
 Theresa Stahl – viola
 Clark Stiles –  engineer
 Yoichi Suzuki –  composer
 Courtney Taylor-Taylor –  electric guitar
 Robert Taylor – choir, chorus, trombone, trumpet, vocals
 Jayson Thoming-Gale – tamborim
 Masumi Timson – koto
 Yumi Torimaru – tamborim
 Duncan Tuomi – choir, chorus
 Devin Van Hine – choir, chorus
 Gus Van Sant – vocals
 Roman Vatro – composer
 Inés Voglar – violin
  – cello
 Hiroshi Wada – slide guitar
 John Wager –  bass
 Jessica Wasko – choir, chorus
 Michio Yamagami – composer
 Teruo Yamaguchi – engineer
 Saori Yuki – vocals
 Martín Zarzar – bongos, choir, chorus, cymbals, drums, percussion

Credits adapted from Allmusic.

Charts
A Retrospective reached a peak positive of number seven on Billboard Top Jazz Albums chart.

In 2014 it was awarded a double silver certification from the Independent Music Companies Association, which indicated sales of at least 40,000 copies throughout Europe.

Release history

Release history adapted from Pink Martini's official website

See also
 Michael Feinstein discography

References

External links
 A Retrospective at Wrasse Records

2011 compilation albums
Compilation albums by American artists
Easy listening compilation albums
Heinz Records albums
Jazz albums by American artists
Jazz compilation albums
Pink Martini albums
Pop rock compilation albums